A blindfold is a garment, usually of cloth, tied to one's head to cover the eyes to disable the wearer's sight.

Blindfold may also refer to:
Blindfold (1928 film), a 1928 film
Blindfold (1966 film), a 1966 film starring Rock Hudson and Claudia Cardinale
Blindfold (comics), a comic book character
Blindfold (album), a 1999 album by Greenthink
Blindfold (EP), a 1991 EP by Curve
"Blindfold," a song by Morcheeba from their 1998 album Big Calm
"Blindfold," a song by Gunna from his 2020 album Wunna
Blindfold chess, a way to play chess
Blindfold, a 1995 science fiction novel by Kevin J. Anderson
Blindfold, a 1960 novel by Lucille Fletcher
Blindfolded (film), a lost 1918 silent film